Maxime Mehinto (born 26 November 1960) is a Beninese boxer. He competed in the men's light middleweight event at the 1984 Summer Olympics.

References

1960 births
Living people
Beninese male boxers
Olympic boxers of Benin
Boxers at the 1984 Summer Olympics
Place of birth missing (living people)
Light-middleweight boxers